Daniel O'Quinn Jr. (born May 7, 1985) is an American professional stock car racer from Coeburn, Virginia.  Now retired, he competed in the NASCAR Nationwide Series and was a winner of the Roush Racing: Driver X competition.

Background 
O'Quinn began racing go-karts at the age of 7 and won four championships. He won over 130 races, and one Tennessee state championship between 1992 and 1998.

In 1999 he became the Street Stock rookie of the year at Lonesome Pine Raceway. He moved up to a late model car in 2000 and won the track championship and the Rookie of the Year award. In 2001, he raced both at Lonesome Pine and the ARA series. He had three wins and four poles. He also attended the University of Virginia's College at Wise in 2003–2005 but put his collegiate pursuits on hold as his professional racing career took off.

In 2002, he won the UARA late model touring series national championship.

Move to national driver 
Quinn moved up to the USAR Hooters Pro Cup (Southern Series) in 2003, and became the Southern Series Rookie of the Year. In 2004, he won the Food City 250 at his home race track of Lonesome Pine Raceway in Coeburn, Virginia. He became the youngest driver to win in series history and finished seventh overall in points. In 2005, he had six starts in the ARCA series and three sixth-place finishes.

NASCAR career

In the fall of 2005, O'Quinn was a contestant on Roush Racing: Driver X. He was ultimately runner-up in the competition, but skipped the Craftsman Truck Series and proceeded directly to the Busch Series with Driver X winner Erik Darnell being inked to the Roush truck contract.

In 2006, he raced the World Financial Group No. 50 Ford in the Busch Series. He got his first Top-10 finish at Nashville Superspeedway after starting second, and followed it up with Top-10s at  Milwaukee, ORP, Memphis and Charlotte, where he scored a career best finish of 5th.
O'Quinn was named Busch Series Rookie of the Year after the 2006 Season Finale at Homestead-Miami Speedway beating former NASCAR Winston Cup driver John Andretti and teammate Todd Kluever, among others, for the award. In 2007, O'Quinn made occasional starts in No. 17 Dish Network Ford and also ran part-time with Mac Hill Motorsports in the No. 56 Chevy.

After driving part-time in 2007 in selected races with Roush Fenway Racing. O'Quinn announced his departure from the team, due to a lack of sponsorship which prohibited from landing a full-time ride with the team. He then signed on to drive the No. 56 Chevy for Mac Hill Motorsports part-time for the remainder of the year. He made only one start in 2008 for Mac Hill, where he finished 28th at Richmond. He ended the year driving the No. 35 Team Rensi Motorsports Ford on a part-time basis, with a best finish of 40th. He signed with JD Motorsports in 2009, and drove the No. 01 Sun Drop Chevrolet Impala. Following the Food City 250 on August 21, 2009, O'Quinn left the JD Motorsports team. He finished the year by start and parking for K-Automotive Motorsports and Fitz Racing. In 2011, O'Quinn joined Go Green Racing, where he ran five races.

After O'Quinn's NASCAR career stalled, he moved back to Virginia to help run the family trailer business. O'Quinn also occasionally raced at the Lonesome Pine Raceway.

Motorsports career results

NASCAR
(key) (Bold – Pole position awarded by qualifying time. Italics – Pole position earned by points standings or practice time. * – Most laps led.)

Nationwide Series

Craftsman Truck Series

ARCA Re/Max Series
(key) (Bold – Pole position awarded by qualifying time. Italics – Pole position earned by points standings or practice time. * – Most laps led.)

References

External links
 
 

Living people
1985 births
People from Coeburn, Virginia
Racing drivers from Virginia
NASCAR drivers
CARS Tour drivers
ARCA Menards Series drivers
RFK Racing drivers